Brooklyn is a suburb of Wellington, the capital city of New Zealand.

Geography

Location 
Brooklyn is 3 km south of Wellington's central business district on the eastern slopes of the hills above Happy Valley.

Nearby suburbs and areas include:

 To the north: Aro Valley and Highbury
 To the east: Mount Cook
 To the south: Vogeltown, Mornington and Ōwhiro Bay
 To the west: Kowhai Park, Panorama Heights, Mitchelltown, Karori.

History

Māori history 
In pre-European times, Māori knew the Brooklyn hills as Turanga-rere, translated as "the waving plumes of the war-party". The historian James Cowan, in investigating the original Māori names for places in and around Wellington City, suggested this referred to how the tall trees moved in the wind, as "when the warriors stood up to dance... all their feather hair-adornments would wave to and fro".

Brooklyn and the wider Wellington region then and  hosted a number of iwi, or tribes, all represented through a Charter of Understanding with Wellington Regional Council signed in July 2000:

 Te Āti Awa
 Muaupoko
 Rangitāne o Wairarapa
 Ngāti Raukawa
 Ngāti Toa (Ngāti Toarangatira)
 Te Atiawa ki Whakarongotai

European settlement 
European settlement began in the area during the 1840s. In January 1842 the ship London commanded by Captain Attwood set sail for its second voyage to Wellington from Gravesend in Kent. It carried 700 tons of cargo, 137 adults and 39 children. On 1 May 1842 the ship arrived in Wellington, with John and Louisa Fitchett and their seven children amongst the passengers.

The young colony established a district of Ohiro in the early 1840s from the land surrounding Port Nicholson (officially renamed Wellington Harbour in 1980). Settlers could access the new district only via the steep Ohiro Road from present-day Aro Street. The land became subdivided into many blocks. In 1852 John Fitchett purchased a number of these blocks and established a dairy farm called Ohiro Farm, known also as Fitchett's Farm. A township named Fitchett Town formed in the 1860s; it gained its new name "Brooklyn" in 1888 when the then land-owners, Ashton B. Fitchett (son of John Fitchett d.1875) and R.B. Todman, offered the main subdivision for sale. The offer included 208 lots of Fitchett's Farm next to Brooklyn.

In 1899, after the sale, a further subdivision took place, and the main roads of Mitchell and Todman Streets took form. These were then intersected with Reuben, Bruce, Laura and Charlotte Avenues, Tanera Crescent, Apuka Street and Sugar Loaf Road (the site of the War Memorial). In 1902 Brooklyn was extended further up the Brooklyn Hills when Ashton B. Fitchett sold additional lots of land. Both Karepa and Apuka Streets were extended onto this newly available land.

A new tramway route opened in 1906. Unlike the existing route to Brooklyn via Aro Street and Ohiro Road which had excessively steep gradients, the new route was cut through the town belt by Central Park. This route later became today's Brooklyn Road. On 3 May 1907, a tram crashed on the Brooklyn hill due to brake failure and one passenger was killed. The tramway closed in 1957, and the City - Brooklyn route is now served by numbers 7 and 17 buses. The number 7 (City - Brooklyn - Kingston) route was electrified as part of the Wellington City trolley bus service which then was terminated in 2017.

Brooklyn takes its name from the borough in New York City, which in turn recalls the Dutch city Breukelen.

Demographics 

Brooklyn had a population of 6,708 at the 2018 New Zealand census, an increase of 201 people (3.1%) since the 2013 census, and an increase of 585 people (9.6%) since the 2006 census. There were 2,544 households. There were 3,276 males and 3,438 females, giving a sex ratio of 0.95 males per female, with 1,116 people (16.6%) aged under 15 years, 1,722 (25.7%) aged 15 to 29, 3,354 (50.0%) aged 30 to 64, and 525 (7.8%) aged 65 or older.

Ethnicities were 81.3% European/Pākehā, 7.2% Māori, 3.4% Pacific peoples, 13.9% Asian, and 4.2% other ethnicities (totals add to more than 100% since people could identify with multiple ethnicities).

The proportion of people born overseas was 29.7%, compared with 27.1% nationally.

Although some people objected to giving their religion, 61.2% had no religion, 24.6% were Christian, 3.4% were Hindu, 0.9% were Muslim, 1.0% were Buddhist and 3.4% had other religions.

Of those at least 15 years old, 2,916 (52.1%) people had a bachelor or higher degree, and 270 (4.8%) people had no formal qualifications. The employment status of those at least 15 was that 3,483 (62.3%) people were employed full-time, 804 (14.4%) were part-time, and 246 (4.4%) were unemployed.

Landmarks and features

Parks and Town Belt 

 Central Park. Named after the area of the same name in New York, it separates Brooklyn from the city. Established in 1913 on Town Belt land, and opened on Labour Day, 27 October 1913, the park features a set of wrought-iron gates at its main entrance: the then Mayor, John Pearce Luke donated them in 1920. During World War II, American forces established a military camp in the park between 1942 and 1944. In October 1942 building work started with an initial requirement to accommodate 416 men of the US Marine Corps. The partly built camp could accept some occupants by 22 November 1942, and by July 1943 it could accommodate 540 personnel. The US Marines requested a further expansion of the camp, but the improving military situation precluded the expansion.

 Tanera Park. Lies to the north and north-west of Central Park on the opposite side of Ohiro Road. The park has sports facilities, including soccer, cricket, and artificial surfaces as well as changing-rooms. In 1991 the Wellington City Council set aside some of the park as trial to help low-income families and community-organisations to grow their own vegetables. The gardens,  including 33 plots, have become known as the Tanera Community Gardens; the Mokai Kainga Trust manages them.

 Elliott Park. Lies on the western side of Brooklyn, adjacent to Mitchell Street and Karepa Street. The park used to have a children's play-ground, however the play-ground has been removed by the Wellington City Council and not replaced. The park was donated by Mr Elliott who used to have his farm in this place. There are still also wild Pigs and goats that live on the bottom of the hills.

Brooklyn Hill 

Wind turbine 

The Electricity Corporation of New Zealand installed the Brooklyn wind turbine on Pol Hill above north-western Brooklyn in March 1993 as part of a research project into wind-power generation. The Corporation chose the Brooklyn site due to Wellington's "higher than normal" wind patterns and to gain maximum exposure in the viewshed of Wellingtonians. The turbine, visible from many parts of the city, stands 299 meters above sea level. It became the oldest operating wind turbine in New Zealand 

The original turbine was decommissioned in 2015 due to age, and replaced in 2016 with a larger version. The original turbine, a Vestas Wind Systems A/S turbine, was a relatively small machine compared with other turbines  installed in New Zealand, such as those at Te Āpiti Wind Farm, with an installed capacity of 225 kW. The present turbine, a German Enercon E-44, has a capacity of 900 kW, enough to power around 490 homes, with the power generated going into the local network for general distribution. The tower hub is 44m high and the blades are 20.8m long.

Meridian Energy has managed the turbine since its formation as a company in 1999 with the deregulation of the New Zealand electricity market.

War memorial 

Brooklyn's World War I war memorial overlooks northern Brooklyn from the top of Sugarloaf Hill. It lists the names of the 48 Brooklyn soldiers who died in that war.

Soon after the war ended in 1918 a movement to build a memorial began, with the funds raised in two years. The Brooklyn Returned Services Association (RSA) chose as a monument a carved marble statue depicting a soldier with hat in hand, looking towards the harbour heads through which sailed the troopships bearing those who would not return. Colonel George Mitchell D.S.O. MP unveiled the memorial on 22 September 1922.

For around 16 years a board of trustees maintained the memorial, before passing it over to Wellington City Council. In 2003 a nine-month restoration took place, which involved re-securing the structure to the concrete pads that it stands on as well as cleaning, restoring plasterwork, removal of rust and replacing parts that had gone missing.

The inscription on the pedestal reads:

The motherland called and they went and these men died for their country.

Pol Hill gun emplacements 
The well-preserved Pol Hill anti-aircraft gun emplacements date from March 1942: built for the capital's defence in response to fears of Japanese air-raids or invasion. Once completed the battery had accommodation for 109 army personnel.

The battery stands slightly north of the wind turbine within Panorama Heights subdivision, on a site allocated as reserve land. The site backs on to the firebreak running around the Zealandia wildlife sanctuary.

Street names

When a syndicate led by J.F.E. Wright (a Wellington Provincial Councillor between 1861 and 1863, and then for Karori and Mākara between 1873 and 1876) subdivided Brooklyn, it named a number of its streets after former US Presidents:

 Grover Cleveland (in office: 1885-1889 and 1893–1897) - Cleveland Street
 Calvin Coolidge (in office: 1923–1929) - Coolidge Street
 James Garfield - Garfield Street
 William Henry Harrison - Harrison Street
 Herbert Hoover (in office: 1929–1933) - Hoover Street
 Thomas Jefferson - Jefferson Street
 Abraham Lincoln - Lincoln Street
 William McKinley - McKinley Crescent
 William Taft - Taft Street
 George Washington - Washington Avenue
Street names with connections to the Fitchett family include Bruce Avenue (named after Bruce Fitchett, grandson of John Fitchett), Laura Avenue (after Laura Walters, who married Ashton B.Fitchett) and Helen Street (after Helen Fitchett, daughter of Ashton B.Fitchett). Reuben Avenue was named after Reuben Short, a long-time employee of John Fitchett. Karepa Street, Apuka Street and Tanera Crescent were named after local Māori who were also employed by John Fitchett. Bretby Street was named after John Fitchett's birthplace in Derbyshire.

Gallery

Notable buildings and sites

Architectural styles 
Brooklyn features a number of different styles of buildings, although very few of the older cottage style remain. One of the oldest recorded in the general area stands in Nairn Street in the neighbouring suburb of Mount Cook. It dates from 1858, and hosts The Colonial Cottage Museum. Brooklyn itself contains examples of many building styles including:

 Villa (Simple villas) - from c. 1895
 Bay villa - from c. 1910
 California bungalow - from c. 1920
 State House - between 1930 and 1940
 Bungalow - from c. 1960

Villa (Simple villas) 
The Simple Villa, a style of home built from around 1895, often appears in the form of structures larger than the cottages and Victorian style properties built prior to this time. They generally consisted of a hallway with two rooms off each side and an indoor bathroom at the end. Often a "lean-to" attached to the back of the house would allow for a storage area that might include a wash-house. With the design of the property having the chimney within the house (as opposed to attached to an exterior side wall) fireplaces in the sitting room and kitchen could both use the same chimney — a configuration known as "back-to-back". Brooklynites built these homes from timber — with most of the period features (including architraves, skirting-boards, doors and windows) purchasable as standard items from timber merchants.

Buildings of special interest 

 The Sutch House, designed by Ernst Plischke and built between 1953 and 1956, stands on Todman Street. The house shows influences of the Austrian Neues Bauen (New Construction) movement to which Plischke had belonged in the 1930s. Wellington architect Alistair Luke restored the Sutch House during 2003 and the restoration project later received the 2004 New Zealand Institute of Architects Resene Award for Enduring Architecture.
 Tower Studio (located on Karepa Street), a purpose-built five-level Tuscan tower, takes its inspiration from the towers of San Gimignano in Tuscany. It overlooks the native bush reserve in Brooklyn with an open belvedere offering 360° views.

House prices 
Between 2017 and 2021 the median house sale price in Brooklyn increased from $690,000 to $1.1 million. As of 2021, the median rental in Brooklyn is $685.

Facilities and amenities

Cinema 
Brooklyn hosts the Penthouse Cinema, located on Ohiro Road just south of Cleveland Street. Constructed for the Ranish family in the art deco style, it opened on 15 June 1939 as the Vogue Theatre. The Ranish family ran the cinema until 1951, when the Vogue Company Limited took over. The Vogue Company turned the cinema into a television studio where TV commercials were shot. The building was renamed the Penthouse Cinema when it was bought by Merv and Carol Kisby in 1975. Since then additional screens have been added, as well as refurbishment of the interior in keeping with its original style.

Library 
Brooklyn has a branch library, opened on 16 February 1905 at 22 Harrison Street as the second branch library of the main Central Library. It opened with 350 books and for 9 hours per week; the Librarian lived in a flat at the rear of the building. In 1960 the library moved to the present building on the corner of Harrison and Cleveland Streets. The original entrance was in Harrison Street, but in 1992 this was closed and ramp access provided in Cleveland Street, enabling pushchairs to enter easily. The original building is now the Brooklyn Playcentre.

Churches 
 Wellington Korean Church: 184 Ohiro Road, Brooklyn, Wellington (Wellington Christ's Letter Church At the Korean Presbyterian Church of Jesus in Daeyangju (Gosin Overseas))
 Reformed Church of Wellington: 36 Harrison Street, Brooklyn, Wellington  (evangelical in approach, and reformed in theology)
 Anglican/Two Todman: 2 Todman street, Brooklyn, Wellington - Two Todman is run by the Brooklyn Anglicans. Our four spaces include a Co-Working Office, Community Space, Chapel and Op-Shop
 CLOSED - St Matthew's Anglican/Joint Parish (St Matthew's combined Anglican, Methodist and Presbyterian groups in the 1970s), 96 Washington Avenue, Brooklyn, Wellington. The site was sold by the Anglican church and has been developed into a multi unit residential development.  
 CLOSED - St Bernard's Church (Catholic), 37 Taft Street, Brooklyn, Wellington

Malaysian High Commission 
The Malaysian High Commission occupies the corner of Washington Avenue and Brooklyn Road. It is the world's southernmost High Commission.

Transportation 

Brooklyn is served by routes 7, 17 and 29.

Government

Brooklyn forms part of the Lambton Ward for the Local Authority Elections that elect members to the Wellington City Council; a small area at the southern end of Brooklyn is part of the Southern Ward. The Council approved its ward system for the 2007 Local Authority Elections on 8 July 2006.

Education

Brooklyn School 

The school opened in November 1888.

St Bernard's School 

The school started in 1935 when the Sisters of Mercy provided two sisters, Boniface and Fabian. It opened on 5 February of that year as St Anthony's School Brooklyn, in the church on Jefferson Street - the church itself opened in June 1911. At the time the school opened 44 Catholic children attended the local state school, 43 of whom transferred to St Anthony's on opening day. By the end of the year the roll had risen to 69.

The building remained as one large church hall, installing a temporary partition during the week to create a second classroom. On Fridays after school had finished the partition and desks were removed and replaced with pews for the Mass on Sunday, after which the desks and partition were put back ready for school on Monday morning.

In 1949 the then Parish Priest Father Paul Kane procured land at the  site on Taft Street. The parish re-located the church and had a new school built. However, in 1961 the parish and the school changed their name: the Priest who enacted this bore the name "Bernard". The Sisters of Mercy continued to run the school until 1973 when Doreen Barry became the first lay Principal.

Notable people 
 John Henry Heaton, customs and shipping agent, member of the Harbour Board and mayor of Melrose 
 Ernst Plischke (1903–1992), architect
 Jane Thomson (1858–1944), mountaineer
 Shihad (once called Pacifier), band
 Bill Sutch (1907–1975), teacher, economist, writer and diplomat
 Raymond Ching, (1939-), painter

References

External links 

 Brooklyn Local History Suburb Guide

Suburbs of Wellington City